Draycott in the Moors is a village between Stoke on Trent and Uttoxeter near the River Blythe. It is two and a half miles from Cheadle and is near Blythe Bridge railway station, on the North Staffordshire Railway.

In 1851 the parish contained 518 inhabitants. Sir Edward Vavasour, Bart., was the lord of the manor.

Notable residents
 The recusant Draycot family lived in the parish. Anthony Draycot, priest, died here in 1571.
 Joseph Reeves, a shepherd of this parish, who claimed to have lived to be 127 years old. He said he had never taken tobacco or physic, nor drank between meals, alleviating his thirst by rolling pebbles in his mouth."

See also
Listed buildings in Draycott in the Moors
Cresswell, Staffordshire

References

External links

Villages in Staffordshire
Civil parishes in Staffordshire
Staffordshire Moorlands